Çayırköprü is a village in the Aydıntepe District, Bayburt Province, Turkey. Its population is 96 (2021).

References

Villages in Aydıntepe District